= The Evergreen State =

The Evergreen State may refer to:

- The Evergreen State College
- Nickname for Washington (state)
